Bhagalpur is a city in the Indian state of Bihar, situated on the southern bank of the Ganga river. It is the third largest city of Bihar by population and also serves the headquarters of Bhagalpur district, Bhagalpur division & Eastern Range. It is known as the Silk City & also listed for development under the Smart Cities Mission by Government of India.
It is the only district in Bihar after capital city Patna where three major higher educational institutions IIIT, TMBU & Agriculture University(BAU) are located and also Vikramshila Central University is under construction next to the ruins of ancient Vikramshila University.
The river around city is home to the Gangetic dolphin, the National Aquatic Animal of India, and the Vikramshila Gangetic Dolphin Sanctuary is established near the town. The city holds the largest Manasa Puja and one of the largest processions in Kali Puja, an intangible cultural heritage of the region.

Demography

As of the 2011 India census, the Bhagalpur Urban Agglomeration has a population of 410,210, of which 218,284 were males and 191,926 were females. It is the 3rd largest city in Bihar in terms of urban population. the total population in the age group of 0 to 6 years is 55,898. The total number of literates are 286,125, with 160,720 males and 125,405 females. The effective literacy rate of 7+ population is 80.76%, of which while the male literacy rate is 84.95% with women at 75.95%.

Climate

Flora and fauna

Greater adjutant (Garuda) 

Greater adjutant (Leptoptilos dubius), a member of the stork family, associated with the mythical bird Garuda, has a Rescue and Rehabilitation Area located in Bhagalpur, the second largest of its kind. Loss of nesting habitat and feeding sites through drainage, pollution and disturbance, together with hunting and egg collection, caused a massive dip in the population of the species. Garuda birds were first spotted nesting and breeding on a silk cotton tree near a village in the Ganga-Diara area in Bhagalpur in 2007. In May 2006, 42 birds were seen by the Mandar Nature Club team for the first time. Prior to this, the species had never been seen in Bihar during its breeding period. Four years after these endangered birds of the stork family started nesting and breeding in Bhagalpur district, their number eventually increased, from 78 to over 500, making Bhagalpur one of only three places to host Garudas; the others being Cambodia and Assam.

The greater adjutant is classified as endangered on the IUCN Red List 2004 of threatened species and listed under Schedule IV of the Indian Wildlife (Protection) Act, 1972. This huge stork has a naked pink head, a very thick yellow bill and a low-hanging neck pouch. The neck ruff is white. The bird looks like a vulture. Other than the pale grey edge on each wing, the rest of the greater adjutant's body is dark grey. Younglings have a narrower bill, thicker down on the head and neck, and entirely dark wings. A Garuda bird measures 145–150 cm (about three feet) in length and four to five feet in height.

Local attractions

Kali Puja
Kali Puja is one of the most important festivals in and around the region. Several Kali Temples and Puja Mandaps are decked up on Deepawali to worship Kalika. The procession after the Puja is so long that it takes 36 hours to complete one big phase of Murti Bisarjan. Kali Puja holds the cultural significance of the Anga Region. The procession after the Puja is the intangible cultural asset to the city.

Sati Behula 
In medieval Bengali literature, Mansamangal is projected has heroine and a goddess. In the period from the thirteenth to the eighteenth century, many works based on this story were made. The religious purpose of these works was to render the importance of Mansa Devi, but these works are more known for the pious love of Behula and her husband Lakhander (Lakhindar or Lakshinder.) This is the story of Bihula-Bishhari from capital of Angdesh Champa (Now in Bhagalpur district called as Champanagar). However, this is not just a methological story, the evidence of the metal house created by lord Bishyakarma on Oder of Chand Saudagar for Behula and her husband Lakhander to protect from mansa devi is still been seen and reported when there is heavy rain in the region.

Budhanath Temple
Spread over three acres Budhanath temple is located on the banks of the Uttarvahini Ganga (flowing from south to north) River. Being one of the oldest temples in the region, it witnesses influx of devotees throughout the year. It is about twenty minutes from the main town. Reference of Baba Budhanath can be found in Shiva Purana as Baba Bal Vridheshwarnath. Also, this name has been stated in the first segment of the eighth segments of Shiva Purana. The lingam of this place of worship is self-incarnated nevertheless as to when it came into being is still unknown. Idol of Ma Bhavani can be seen beside the Shivalinga or Lingam.

Shri Champapur Digamber Jain Temple

Champapur is an ancient and historic Teerth Kshetra of Jainism. Champapur is the place where all the five Kalyanaks i.e., Garbha, Janam, Tapa, KevalGyan and Moksha Kalyanak of Bhagwan Vasupujya, the 12th Jain Teerthankar, have taken place.
The Champapur was the capital of ‘Anga Janpada'. The Anga Janpada was one of the 52 Janapada established by Adi Teerthankar Bhagwan Rishabh Deo. Champapur also existed as Mahajanapada among the six Mahajanapadas during the time of Bhagwan Mahavira Swami.

The three Chaturmas of Bhagwan Mahavira Swami during his Dikshakal, religious propagation centre of Anga-Banga-Magadh-Vaishali, test of modesty of Sati Subhadra and Anantmati, Aahardan to Bhagwan Mahaveer Swami by Sati Chandan Bala have taken place in Champapur. Champapur is also related to great stories of 'origin of Harivansha, Shripal-Mainasundari, Shri Dharma Ghosh Muni, King Karna of Mahabharata, King Mudrak and great architect Vishvakarman’.

The main temple of Champapur Siddha Kshetra is quite ancient (about 2500 years). This temple being symbolic of 'Panch Kalyanaka' is adorned with 5 altars, magnificent spire and 2 columns of fame. It is said that there were 4 'Columns of Fame (Keerti Stambha)’ which existed in four corners of the campus of the temple. Later on the 2 out of 4 were destroyed in the earthquake of year 1934 & repair (Jirnoddhar) of other 2 columns was done in 1938. The 'Columns of Fame' are about 2200 years ancient.

Khanqah-e-Shahbazia 
Founded in 1577 AD, the Khanqah-e-Shahbazia is one of the most revered shrines of Bhagalpur. It houses the grave of Maulana Shahbaz, a saint whose 13th-generation descendants still run the place. Maulana Shahbaz Rahmatullah is considered one of the 40 Sufi saints sent to spread the message of Allah. The Sajjadah Nasheen (direct descendant of the saint) is supposed to spend his life within the confines of the Khanqah and take care of its management, lead prayers and offer spiritual services. It is said that they are exempted from appearing in a court of law.

The Mosque was built by Aurangzeb and was frequently visited by him. Every Thursday, visitors assemble at the place to be blessed. Most of the visitors are said to be from the eastern parts of India and Bangladesh. There is a belief that the water in a pond here has medicinal qualities that can cure illness and snake bites. Archeological Survey of India has discovered some ancient manuscripts from the basement of Khanqah e Shahbazia.

The Khanqah is also famous for its library, which has a vast collection of Arabic and Persian theological texts, including a copy of the Qur’an transcribed by Murshid Quli Khan, the Nawab of Murshidabad, Bengal.

Important Institutions

Indian Institute of Information Technology(IIIT), Bhagalpur  
Bihar Agricultural University(BAU), Sabour, Bhagalpur 
Jawahar Lal Nehru Medical College & Hospital (JLNMCH), Mayaganj, Bhagalpur
Tilka Manjhi Bhagalpur University (TMBU), Bhagalpur
Central Institute of Petrochemicals Engineering and Technology-CSTS, Bhagalpur
NTPC Kahalgaon, Bhagalpur
Software Technology Park(STPI), Bhagalpur
Vikramshila Central University, Bhagalpur (proposed)
T.N.B. College, Bhagalpur
Bhagalpur College of Engineering(BCE), Bhagalpur
T.N.B. Law College, Bhagalpur
Marwari College, Bhagalpur
State Textile Polytechnic, Bhagalpur
D.A.V. Public School
Mount Assisi School
Mount Carmel School

Media
Print media include the Hindi Dainik Jagran, Dainik Bhaskar, Aaj, Hindustan (under Hindustan Times) and Prabhat Khabar; the Urdu The Inquilab and Taasir, while English Times of India, The Telegraph and Hindustan Times are also available.

Broadcast media include All India Radio (Frequency 1458 kHz, 1206 kHz) 90.4 FM Radio Active (Bhagalpur), and AIR FM Rainbow India 100.1.M, sadhna plus news channel

Telecommunications services include BSNL, Airtel, Vodafone Idea, Reliance Jio.

Airtel, Jio, BSNL and Sify are providing broadband services in this region.

Notable people
Ajit Pal Mangat– Indian film director.
 Alexander Dow – Died at Bhagalpur was an orientalist, writer, playwright and army officer in the East India Company
 Anand Mohan Sahay – General Secretary in INA with Netaji. Ambassador in seven different countries.
 Ashis Nandy – Indian political psychologist, a social theorist, and a contemporary cultural and political critic.
 Ashok Kumar – Hindi Indian movie actor.
 Ashwini Kumar Choubey – BJP politician. Ex health minister of Bihar.
 B. J. Choubey – Professor in the Tilka Manjhi Bhagalpur University
 Balai Chand Mukhopadhyay – Pen name Banaphool, Bengali writer.
 Bhagwat Jha Azad – Former Chief minister of Bihar
 Chunchun Prasad Yadav - Three consecutive times MP from Bhagalpur
 Dibyendu Palit – Bengali writer
 Gurmeet Choudhary – Indian television actor, model and dancer.
 Kadambini Ganguly – Daughter of Braja Kishore Bose, headmaster of Bhagalpur School, was India's one of the first women graduates and Doctor was born in Bhagalpur.
 Lutfur Rahman – Urdu poet
 Nandalal Bose – Artist
 Aisha Sharma - Actress, Bollywood, Sister of Neha Sharma
 Neha Sharma – Hindi & South-Indian movie actress.
Nishikant Dubey
 Pritish Nandy – Poet, painter, journalist, politician, television personality, animal activist and film producer.
 Rabindra Kumar Rana – Politician, Member of the 14th Lok Sabha. 
 Raj Kamal Jha – Chief Editor, The Indian Express; author and novelist
 Ramjee Singh – Book edited - Gandhi's centenary number, T.N.B . college, Bhagalpur University, 1970
 Raveesh Kumar - Indian ambassador to Finland, former spokesperson of Ministry of External Affairs in Government of India.
 Sanjay Jha – Former CEO of Global Foundries.
 Saratchandra Chattopadhyay – Famous Bengali novelist. The novel Srikanth is based on Bhagalpur.
 Suchitra Bhattacharya – Acclaimed Indian novelist was born in Bhagalpur on 10 January 1950.
 Syed Shahnawaz Hussain – BJP leader
Gurmeet Choudhary – Bollywood Actor.

 Tapan Sinha – Film director
 Tilka Manjhi – First Santhal freedom fighter.
 Ajit Sharma – Member of Bihar Legislative Assembly from Bhagalpur constituency.

Regional/Zonal offices in Bhagalpur
India Post East Region Bhagalpur 
Zonal Accounts Office, CBDT (Bhagalpur) 
State Bank of India
Bank of India
Union Bank of India
UCO Bank
Indian Bank (Allahabad Bank)
Punjab National Bank Circle Office
Airtel Zonal Office
LIC Divisional Office
Bihar School Examination Board
Bihar Industrial Area Development Authority(BIADA)
Bihar State Pollution Control Board
  Employees' Provident Fund Organisation(EPFO) Sub-Regional Office, Bhagalpur
MSME office Bhagalpur
Regional Forensic science laboratory
Regional Water Treatment Laboratory
Regional Dairy Development Office
National Career Service(NCS) Regional office
Environment And Forest Division Bhagalpur

See also
1980 Bhagalpur blindings
1989 Bhagalpur violence
Aranyak
Bhagalpur sari

References

External links

 Official Bhagalpur District website
 

 
Cities and towns in Bhagalpur district